XHUX-FM is a radio station on 92.1 FM in Tepic, Nayarit, with transmitter in El Jicote. The station is owned by Capital Media

History
XHUX began as XEUX-AM 810, located in Tuxpan, Nayarit, with a concession awarded to Salvador Herena Benítez on May 3, 1950. In 2010, Luis Eduardo Stephens Zavala sold the station to Master Radio de Occidente, which is 50 percent owned by Capital Media, 25 percent by Stephens Zavala and 25 percent by Corporativo Difusión Atemajac, the primary shareholder of the concessionaire for XHXT-FM.

In 2011, XEUX migrated to FM as XHUX-FM 92.1.

Alica Medios took over operation of XHUX on May 17, 2021.

References

Radio stations in Nayarit